Streetcars in Seattle may refer to 
 Seattle Street Railway - former urban streetcar system in Seattle
 Seattle Streetcar - current urban streetcar system in Seattle